Lee Chung-Hee (Hangul: 이충희, born November 7, 1959 in Cheolwon, Gangwon Province) is a retired South Korean basketball player.

He played as a shooting guard. Widely considered as the best Asian perimeter shooter of all time, Lee Chung Hee was named the Most Valuable Player of the 14th Asian Basketball Championship, albeit South Korea lost to China at the final in 1987. He is 182 cm (5 ft 11 in) tall.  He competed at the 1988 Seoul Olympic Games, where the South Korean team finished in ninth position.

His former teams include Hyundai Electronics and Hung Kuo Elephants.

References

1959 births
Living people
Asian Games bronze medalists for South Korea
Asian Games gold medalists for South Korea
Asian Games medalists in basketball
Asian Games silver medalists for South Korea
Basketball players at the 1978 Asian Games
Basketball players at the 1982 Asian Games
Basketball players at the 1986 Asian Games
Basketball players at the 1988 Summer Olympics
Basketball players at the 1990 Asian Games
Changwon LG Sakers coaches
Goyang Carrot Jumpers coaches
Jeonju KCC Egis players
Medalists at the 1978 Asian Games
Medalists at the 1982 Asian Games
Medalists at the 1986 Asian Games
Medalists at the 1990 Asian Games
Olympic basketball players of South Korea
Shooting guards
South Korean basketball coaches
South Korean men's basketball players
1990 FIBA World Championship players
Wonju DB Promy coaches
1986 FIBA World Championship players
Hung Kuo basketball players
Chinese Basketball Alliance imports